Kunani (also Romanized as Kūnānī and Konānī) is a city in and capital of Kunani District, in Kuhdasht County, Lorestan Province, Iran. At the 2006 census, its population was 15000, in 3000 families.

References

Towns and villages in Kuhdasht County
Cities in Lorestan Province